Philipp von Rothenstein (d. 1604) was briefly the Prince-Bishop of Worms in 1604.

Bibliography 
 Georg Helwich:„Wormatiensis Chronici“, Mainz, 1614
 Friedhelm Jürgensmeier: „Das Bistum Worms von der Römerzeit bis zur Auflösung 1801“, pages 187 - 189, Echter Verlag, Würzburg, 1997, 
 Christian von Stramberg and Anton Joseph Weidenbach: „Denkwürdiger und Nützlicher rheinischer Antiquarius“, Koblenz, 1863

Notes 

1604 deaths
Roman Catholic bishops of Worms
Year of birth unknown